Benkovac is a village in Croatia. It is connected by the D5 highway.

Notable individuals
Miloš N. Đurić

Populated places in Brod-Posavina County